Sumpah Pemuda Stadium or Stadion Sumpah Pemuda is a football stadium which is also sometimes used for athletics in Lampung, Indonesia. The stadium has a capacity of 25,000. Lampung Sakti, PSBL Bandar Lampung and Badak Lampung are the tenants of the venue.

Location
PKOR Way Halim (Jl. Sultan Agung, Way Halim), Bandar Lampung, Lampung, Indonesia

Stadium Condition

References

 
Badak Lampung F.C.
Bandar Lampung
Lampung
Sport in Lampung
Sports venues in Indonesia
Football venues in Indonesia
Athletics (track and field) venues in Indonesia
Multi-purpose stadiums in Indonesia
Sports venues in Bandar Lampung
Football venues in Bandar Lampung
Athletics (track and field) venues in Bandar Lampung